Abacuk Pricket was the navigator of the Discovery on the fourth voyage of captain Henry Hudson. He was one of the mutineers who set Hudson adrift in a small boat, and then returned to England, eventually being one of only eight sailors who made it back to England alive. He was tried in 1618, but the authorities did not want to execute those who had saved the expedition and did not prosecute them for mutiny, but for murder. The court found that it was not murder to turn experienced seamen adrift near a shore that was neither barren nor uninhabited and acquitted Pricket.

Pricket is best known for writing a detailed account of Captain Hudson's journey to North America and the subsequent mutiny.

Works
''A Journal of Mr. Hudson's last Voyage for the Discovery of a North-west Passage. Navigantium atque Itinerantium Bibliotheca. 
 Excerpt from A Larger Discourse of the Same Voyage, by Abacuk Pricket,1625

Notes and references
 
 
 

English explorers
Explorers of the Arctic
Explorers of Canada
English explorers of North America
British mutineers